Malonyl CoA reductase (malonate semialdehyde-forming) (NADP-dependent malonyl CoA reductase, malonyl CoA reductase (NADP)) is an enzyme with systematic name malonate semialdehyde:NADP+ oxidoreductase (malonate semialdehyde-forming). This enzyme catalyse the following chemical reaction

 malonate semialdehyde + CoA + NADP+  malonyl-CoA + NADPH + H+

Requires Mg2+. Catalyses the reduction of malonyl-CoA to malonate semialdehyde.

References

External links 
 

EC 1.2.1